Malvajerd (also Romanized as Mālvājerd, Māl-e Vājerd, Māl Vājerd; also known as Malvard) is a village in jargaviyeh Olya Rural District, Jargaviyeh Olya District, Isfahan County, Isfahan Province, Iran. At the 2006 census, its population was 904, in 280 families. at the 2018 census, this village population is 815, in 260 families.

Malvajerd is a place in the region of Ostan-e Esfahan in Iran at 32°4'12" north of the equator and 52°34'48" east of the Greenwich Prime.
 
Latitude/Breadth: 32°4'12"N (32.0740000°)
Longitude/Length: 52°34'48"E (52.5792000°)
Malvajard (Malvard), a historical village located in the Upper Jargaviyeh sub-district of the Upper Jargaviyeh section of the Jargaviyeh city of Isfahan 

The ethnicity of the people of this village is Persian and the language and dialect of the people of Malvajard, unlike the neighboring cities and villages, which mostly speak Velayati, a branch of the Sassanid Pahlavi language, is Persian with a dialect close to Tehrani and Shirazi dialects.

In the recent past, Malvajard village was more advanced than neighboring villages in all areas, but due to the severe drought crisis in Malvajard and the migration of 90% of the village population to Tehran, it could not maintain its former position in the region.

The main job of the Malvardians living in Tehran is the production of wall clocks, which has been able to occupy a significant share of the production of this product in the country.
The population of this village increases significantly in the decade of Muharram and Nowruz.

Historical and traditional texture in the south and a natural aquarium in the center and attached to the ancient castle of the historic village of Malvajard.

There are two earthen dams in the northwest and west and a seasonal river in the south and agricultural pastures on the outskirts of the village.

Imamzadeh Malvard ‌, the tomb of Mirasmail and the comprehensive historical mosque are among the religious sites of this village

Abolfazl sadeghi

Early history

In this village there are very interesting wedding customs. They played the trumpet and other instruments, folk dancing for seven days.
Mohammad Hassan Etemad al Saltanehh was historian person in Naser al dean shah Qajar era. He wrote about Jarghoye in book named as MerAt al Baldan .it seem that the original of Jarghoye is four mountain and it seems is near of Isfahan. It seems that original name is Garkoye. Mohammad Mahdi Mohammad Reza Isfahani has a different concept for this name. The six olace of Isfahan is Jarghoye. Garkoye is another name and consists of the two words Olya and Sofla. Sayed Ali Jenab has a different idea about this place: it is Jarkohe; Jar means gap and Kohe means mountain. Because Jarghoye Oliya exist of a mountain like Malvajerd and Dastjerd, so it named as Garkoye
Mohammad Ali Mir Haj Mohammad Abadi wrote in his thesis: at first Jarghoye named as Garkoye . This is because it located in 3 km northeast of Mohammad Abad and 6 km northwest of Azarkharan Kohi, there is a mountain named as Gar kohe. It means the Mountains without vegetation and bare, by passing time this name convey to Garkoye ; the dry land. Finally it changed to Jarghoye.
A valid document from about 500 years ago ..
The order of Shah_Tahmasb is Safavid, regarding the forgiveness of taxes from the people of Isfahan and its functions
 In this sentence, from the southern and southeastern part of Isfahan, only #Village_Malvajard and Ghomsheh (Shahreza) are mentioned.
 The importance and development of Malvajard at that time was equal to Shahreza and no village was mentioned in the upper and lower Jargaviyeh.
 This ruling is currently on a stone with embossed lines in the Isfahan Grand Mosque.

Geography

Distance as the crow flies between Malvajerd and Iran's capital Tehran is approximately 416 km (259 mi.) and as ground driver about 580 km. Distance between Malvajerd and Isfahan is 120 km.
Malvajerd is known for its natural water spring and landscape.

People
Sadeghi, Mousavi and Nikbakht are the main family names in this village.

Economy
Some shopping stores is available in this village, of them the biggest is shopping of Haj Hosein Reza Karbalaee Abbas and shopping of Aftabgardan.

Places found around Malvajerd

Allahabad, 2 km (1 mi.);

Qal`eh Ja`farabad-e Shur Ab, 2 km (1 mi.);

Mazra`eh-ye Gareh, 6 km (4 mi.);

Dejkuh, 7 km (5 mi.);

Khara, 8 km (5 mi.);

Kureh, 8 km (5 mi.);

Darmangah, 8 km (5 mi.);

Hasanabad-e Jarquyeh, 8 km (5 mi.);

Kamalabad-e Jarquyeh, 10 km (7 mi.);

Dastjerd, 12 km (7 mi.);

Reza'iyeh, 12 km (8 mi.);

Mirza Dar-e Bagh, 13 km (8 mi.);

Shahr-e Saray, 13 km (8 mi.);

Dastjerd-e Jarquyeh, 14 km (8 mi.);

References 

Populated places in Isfahan County